Inside Tucson Business is a weekly newspaper published in Tucson that covers the business, financial, and economic news of Southern Arizona. It was owned by Wick Communications from 1992 to 2014, when it was sold to 10/13 Communications. 

In 2021, Times Media acquired the Tucson publications of 10/13 Communications (including The Explorer, the Marana News, Foothills News, Desert Times, Tucson Weekly, and Inside Tucson Business).

See also

 List of business newspapers
 List of newspapers in Arizona

References

External links
insidetucsonbusiness.com

1990 establishments in Arizona
Business newspapers published in the United States
Newspapers published in Arizona
Publications established in 1990
Wick Communications publications
Weekly newspapers published in the United States